Muzychuk is a gender-neutral Ukrainian surname. People with that name include:
Anna Muzychuk (born 1990), Ukrainian chess player, sister of Mariya
Mariya Muzychuk (born 1992), Ukrainian chess player, sister of Anna

Ukrainian-language surnames